Grassfield High School is a public high school located in Chesapeake, Virginia, USA, and is administered by Chesapeake City Public Schools. It was built to ease overcrowding at Deep Creek High School, Great Bridge High School, and Hickory High School. Grassfield, along with Western Branch High School and Oscar Smith High School, features the latest technology available in the school district. Grassfield is also the City of Chesapeake's location for the STEM (Science, Technology, Engineering, and Mathematics) school as various high school students around the city can apply for admission into the program.

History
By 2004 the school district was planning to spend $63.6 million to build Grassfield, and anticipated it would open in 2007.

Extracurriculars

Athletics
Grassfield's 24 varsity sports teams compete in Conference 2 of the VHSL's Group 6A South Region.

Fall - Cheerleading, Boys and Girls Cross Country, Field Hockey, Football, Boys and Girls Golf, Boys and Girls Volleyball, Marching Band
Winter - Boys and Girls Basketball, Cheerleading, Gymnastics, Boys and Girls Indoor Track, Boys and Girls Swimming and Diving, Wrestling, Winter Guard, and Crew (rowing)
Spring - Baseball, Boys and Girls Tennis, Boys and Girls Soccer, Softball, Boys Lacrosse, and Boys and Girls Outdoor Track
In November 2007 Grassfield held a home run derby to raise money for their athletic teams. It included B.J. Upton, Justin Upton, Ryan Zimmerman, David Wright, Michael Cuddyer, and Mark Reynolds. The Girls Varsity Volleyball team made school history in their fall 2008 season by winning both the regular season and district tournament titles, and receiving the first district championship banner in the gym.

Football
The football team is currently coached by Joe Jones.

(*) Nansemond River High School forfeited their victory due to an ineligible player.

(**) VHSL moved the 2020 season from autumn to spring and reduced the number of games played due to COVID-19 restrictions.

Swimming
During the 2017-2018 Grassfield Swim season the girls team secured a first place victory at regionals.

Wrestling
In February 2009 the Grassfield wrestling team secured 1st place for the regular season and won Southeastern District tournament title. During February, they finished 2nd in the Eastern Regional Tournament and 4th at the AAA state tournament. In 2009, the Grizzlies had 2 state champions: Caleb Richardson in the  class (The Grizzlies' 1st male state champion) and Andrew Clement in the  class.

Drama
In its first year, the Grassfield High School Drama Department collected many awards for its performances. Some awards include Second place at the state level for VHSL Theatre competition, best actor awards and best ensemble from the Greek play "Medea". In their second year, The Grassfield Theater Company travelled to the VTA and got second place in the state, first in districts regionals and state for VHSL, winning two best actor awards and first place overall for their production of John Steinbeck's The Pearl. Grassfield has consistently held one of the top theatre departments in the region, winning 1st place in the VHSL Southeast District competition thirteen years consecutively, and once the reorganization of VHSL, the theatre company has been the Conference 2 champion, regional champion in 
2014, and garnered VHSL State Championships for Region 6A in 2014 with their production of "King Midas and the Golden Touch" as well as their original play "Digital Breadcrumbs" in 2016.

Choral department
The Singers of Grassfield High School received a rating of superior in their inaugural year, and are a participants in various other performances in Chesapeake and Southeastern Virginia. All three of Grassfield High School's choirs, the Select Women's Treble Singers, Chamber Singers, Concert Singers and Freshmen Choir all received a rating of superior in their second year of existence. The Select women's and Chamber are the honors chior that are more evolved in competition and harder music. Both choirs promoting musicianship and pushing the students.

The choir is taught by Elise Krepcho, who creates a positive environment for all the students. The choir holds an annual variety show to raise money for the choral department.

Band Program
In their inaugural year, both the Grassfield High School Freshman and Upperclassmen Concert bands received superior ratings at VBODA District IV band festival. In their second year, the Freshman and Upperclassmen Concert bands received ratings of excellent, and the newly created Symphonic Band received a Superior rating. This gave Grassfield the title of Virginia All-State honors band, for receiving Superior ratings for their Marching and top-ranked Concert bands.  In 2019 the Symphonic Band and Concert band both received superior ratings. 

In the beginning of 2021, new changes were proposed to the Grassfield High School Band Program in an effort to try and earn honor band credits for the students. The Symphonic Band was rebranded as the new Wind Ensemble, while the Concert Band was named as the new Symphonic Band. These changes were put into effect at the beginning of the 2021-2022 school year. The Marching Grizzlies received a superior rating in the 2021 VBODA District IV Marching Band Assessment, which gave Grassfield High School the first half of the title of Virginia All-State Honors Band. The Freshman Band and the Symphonic Band both earned excellent ratings at the 2022 VBODA District IV Band assessment, while the newly established Wind Ensemble received a superior rating; earning Grassfield High School another title of Virginia All-State Honors Band.

Notable alumni
 Grant Holloway – American track and field athlete
 Patrick Jones II – National Football League player

References

External links
 Grassfield Football official website

Educational institutions established in 2007
Public high schools in Virginia
Schools in Chesapeake, Virginia
2007 establishments in Virginia